The 2021 Kyalami 9 Hours was an endurance event that took place on 5 February 2022 at the Kyalami Grand Prix Circuit in Midrand, South Africa. The event was the third and final round of the 2021 Intercontinental GT Challenge. Initially it was to be held on 2-4 December, but it was postponed due to SARS-CoV-2 Omicron variant cases in South Africa and rescheduled to 3-5 February 2022.

Entry list

Results

Qualifying
Fastest in class in bold.

Race
Class winner in bold.

References

External links
Official website

Auto races in South Africa
Kyalami_9_Hours
February 2022 sports events in South Africa
Kyalami 9 Hours